The 1910 Grand National was the 72nd official annual running of the Grand National horse race that took place at Aintree Racecourse near Liverpool, England, on 18 March 1910.

It is the earliest Grand National of which there are moving images.

Finishing Order

Non-finishers

References

 1910
Grand National
Grand National
20th century in Lancashire